Francisca Ondiviela Otero (born May 19, 1962), known professionally as Frances Ondiviela is a Spanish and Mexican actress know for starring in the roles was in the telenovela, Acorralada.

Ondiviela was born in Las Palmas de Gran Canaria. She studied theatre and acting in Spain and Mexico. She was Miss Spain 1980 and represented her country in Miss World 1980 and Miss Universe 1981.

Filmography

External links
 
 Gallery at her manager's website

1961 births
Living people
Miss International 1981 delegates
Miss Spain winners
Miss Universe 1981 contestants
Miss World 1980 delegates
People from Las Palmas
Spanish expatriates in Mexico
Spanish stage actresses
Spanish television actresses
Naturalized citizens of Mexico